KCLJ-LP, virtual and UHF digital channel 30, was a low-powered dual TBN/3ABN-affiliated television station licensed to both Joplin and Carthage, Missouri, United States. The station was owned by Gary and Deborah Kenny. KCLJ-LP's transmitter was located on Lark Road southeast of Joplin, near the Jasper–Newton county line.

History
The station began as K46CZ with a construction permit issued on May 31, 1990 to Gary M. and Deborah R. Kenny. The low-power station was to broadcast on UHF channel 46, serving the Joplin area. After two extensions of the construction permit, the station was licensed on October 19, 1993 and took call letters KCLJ-LP in May 1996. In March 2000, Joplin NBC affiliate KSNF (channel 16) was granted a permit to build its digital facilities on UHF channel 46, displacing KCLJ-LP. In July 2001, the station originally applied to move to channel 24, but later changed the application to specify channel 30. At the same time, they also applied to upgrade the license to Class A. The station was licensed as a Class A on channel 30 on June 14, 2002. The station surrendered its Class A license on April 26, 2011, returning to basic low-power status under the call sign KCLJ-LP. It flash-cut to digital in late 2018.

KCLJ-LP's license was cancelled by the Federal Communications Commission on August 4, 2021, due to the station not being licensed to convert to digital operation by the July 13, 2021 deadline.

Digital channels
The station's digital signal was multiplexed:

Translator

References

Religious television stations in the United States
Trinity Broadcasting Network affiliates
CLJ-LP
Television channels and stations established in 1990
1990 establishments in Missouri
Defunct television stations in the United States
Television channels and stations disestablished in 2021
2021 disestablishments in Missouri
CLJ-LP